The lieutenant governor of Alabama is the president and presiding officer of the Alabama Senate, elected to serve a four-year term. The office was created in 1868, abolished in 1875, and recreated in 1901. According to the current constitution, should the governor be out of the state for more than 20 days, the lieutenant governor becomes acting governor, and if the governor dies, resigns or is removed from office (via impeachment), the lieutenant governor ascends to the governorship. Earlier constitutions said the powers of the governor devolved upon the successor, rather than them necessarily becoming governor, but the official listing includes these as full governors. The governor and lieutenant governor are not elected on the same ticket.

List

Notes

References
General

 

Constitutions

 
 
 
 
 
 

Specific

Alabama
Lieut